The Internet Exchange of Puerto Rico aka Puerto Rico Internet Exchange (IXPR) is an internet exchange point situated in San Juan, Puerto Rico. It was established on November 22, 2005 by Mehmet Akcin and Dr. Oscar Moreno.

IXPR was the first internet exchange point set in Puerto Rico and the Caribbean., ULTRACOM was the first provider to exchange data through the point. IXPR used a Cisco gigabit Ethernet switch.

The exchange point stopped operating in 2007 and was re-established again in 2020

References

Internet exchange points in the United States
Telecommunications in Puerto Rico
University of Puerto Rico
2005 establishments in Puerto Rico
2011 disestablishments in Puerto Rico